Shaquille, Shaquill, or Shaquil is a given name, with Shaq  being a common nickname. It is derived from the Arabic name Shakil. 

Notable people with the name include:

 Shaquil Barrett (born 1992), American football player
 Shaquil Delos (born 1999), French footballer
 Shaquille Dyer (born 1995), Jamaican footballer
 Shaquill Griffin (born 1995), American football cornerback player also known as Shaq Griffin
 Shaquille Harrison (born 1993), American basketball player
 Shaquille Hunter (born 1995), English footballer
 Shaquille Murray-Lawrence (born 1993), Canadian football player in the Canadian Football League
 Shaquille O'Neal (born 1972), American basketball player
 Shaquille Paranihi-Ngauma (born 1993), New Zealand singer
 Shaquille Pinas (born 1998), Dutch footballer
 Shaquille Quarterman (born 1997), American football player
 Shaquille Richardson (born 1992), American football player in the NFL and CFL
 Shaquille Riddick (born 1993), American football player in the NFL
 Shaquill Sno (born 1996), Dutch footballer
 Shaquille Vance (born 1991), American sprinter
 Shaquille Lawson (born 1994), American football player
 Shaquille Thompson (born 1994), American football player
  Shaquille Mason (born 1993), American football player

See also 
 Shaquelle Evans (born 1991), American football player
 Shaquell Moore (born 1996), American soccer player
 Shakeel (name), given name and surname